Skitters may refer to:

 Skitters, a species of alien in Robert Rodat's television series Falling Skies
 An old Scottish word for diarrhea